The cyclas is an unfitted rectangle of cloth with an opening for the head that was worn in Europe in the Middle Ages.

Sleeveless overgowns or tabards derive from the cyclas. By the early 14th century, the sides began to be sewn together, creating a sleeveless overgown or surcoat.

See also 
 1300–1400 in European fashion

References 

History of clothing (Western fashion)